Hina Jilani (؛ born 19 December 1953) is an advocate of the Supreme Court of Pakistan and a human-rights activist from Lahore in Punjab. She is the founder of Pakistan’s first all-women law firm, Pakistan’s first legal aid center and the Women’s Action Forum–-an organization focused on campaigning for women’s rights and addressing Pakistan’s discriminatory laws.

Early life and education
Jilani was born and raised in Pakistan started practicing law in 1979, while Pakistan was under martial law.

Career
Jilani is internationally recognised for her expertise in critical human rights investigations. In February 1980, with her sister Asma Jahangir, she co-founded Pakistan's first all-female legal aid practice, AGHS Legal Aid Cell (ALAC) in Lahore. Initially the activities were confined to providing legal aid to women, but gradually these activities increased to including legal awareness, education, protection from exploitation, legal research, counselling and providing legal assistance as well. She is also one of the founders of the Human Rights Commission of Pakistan and the Women’s Action Forum (WAF) (a pressure group established in 1980 campaigning against
discriminatory legislation) and also founded Pakistan's first legal aid center in 1986. In addition to providing pro bona legal aid, she has also helped set up a shelter for women fleeing violence and abuse, called Dastak in 1991. In addition to managing a shelter, Dastak also organises workshops to create awareness of human rights and the protection of women.

A lawyer and civil society activist and active in the movement for peace, human rights and women's rights in Pakistan for the last three decades, Julani specializes in human rights litigation. She is especially concerned with the human rights of women, children, minorities, bonded and child labour, political and other prisoners. She has conducted several cases which have become landmarks in setting human rights standards in Pakistan. Her battle for the rights of children, especially the protection of child labourers engaged in hazardous work, led to the promulgation an act regulating the employment of children in 1991.

Jilani is often invited to speak at various events pertaining to human rights. On 17 September 2009, she delivered the 2009 Hal Wootten Lecture, at the Faculty of Law at the University of New South Wales. On 25 November, she was invited as guest lecturer at McGill University's Faculty of Law, the McGill Centre for Human Rights & Legal Pluralism, on the topic of "The Promise of International Law for Civilian Victims of War: The Goldstone Report". On 27 November 2009 Jilani was invited as a speaker at the Halifax International Security Forum in Canada on "Law vs. Power: Who Rules? Who Makes the Rules?".

Jilani is also affiliated with the United Nations Human Rights Council, the Carter Center, and the UN Conference on Women. In 2019, The UK foreign office appointed the lawyer to a new panel of experts to develop legal frameworks to protect freedom of the media across the globe.

Other activities

Roles at the United Nations
From 2000 to 2008, Jilani was the United Nations Special Representative of the Secretary-General on Human Rights Defenders. During that period, she was also appointed to the International Commission of Inquiry on Darfur, Sudan, in 2006. 

In 2009, Jilani was appointed to the United Nations Fact Finding Mission on the Gaza Conflict.

In 2017, Jilani co-chaired (alongside Tarja Halonen) the World Health Organization/Office of the United Nations High Commissioner for Human Rights High-Level Working Group on the Health and Human Rights of Women, Children and Adolescents.

Non-profit organizations
On 11 July 2013, Jilani joined The Elders, a group of statesmen, peace activists and human rights advocates, brought together by Nelson Mandela. 

In addition, Jilani holds the following positions:
 World Organisation Against Torture - OMCT, President (since 2016).
 Aurora Prize, Member of the Selection Committee (since 2015)
 Eminent Jurists Panel on Terrorism, Counter-terrorism and Human Rights, Member
 Global Women’s Leadership Project, University of Pennsylvania Law School, Global Advisor
 International Service for Human Rights, Member of the Board (since 2013) 
 Front Line Defenders, Member of the International Advisory Council
 Media Legal Defence Initiative, Patron
 World Refugee & Migration Council (WRMC), Co-Chair
 Nuremberg International Human Rights Award, Member of the Jury (2012–2020)

Threats
As a result of their work in the field of women's activism, Jilani and Jahangir have been arrested, received death threats, and faced hostile propaganda, intimidation, public abuse and murder attempts on themselves and their family. In 1999 after representing the case of Samia Sarwar, a young woman who was seeking divorce from her abusive husband, Jilani and Jahangir were again subject to death threats. Samia's mother came with a gunman to her office on the pretext of seeking reconciliation with her daughter. The gunman shot Samia dead and fired at Hina who managed to escape. Another time, gunmen entered her house and threatened members of her family. She herself was away from home: the threats put pressure on her to migrate, but she refused, and continues to live and work in Lahore.

Views
"The problem with the cases of honour killings and their non-prosecution lies in the permission that the law grants to the family of the victim to compromise the offence, and that's why the person who actually pulls the trigger walks free... although in the case of honour killing it's mostly a conspiracy between more than one member of the family, and that's the major issue here. I don't think the government wishes to address that issue."

"I always had this feeling that if you see injustice, you have to speak out against it; otherwise you are not in a position to complain."

"It was anger against state-sponsored injustice that forced me to enter courtrooms in the 1970s. [...] For all these years I have retained that outrage so I have been able to fight for human rights and against bonded labour, blasphemy laws..." (Monday, 15 March 1999, in Tribune India)

"The right to life of women in Pakistan is conditional on their obeying social norms and traditions."

"There is a real danger of this occurring. The military have an agenda of supporting the extremists and are ideologically very akin to the extremists. It is very important that the world understand how important it is to act in a wise way."

"The United States totally misread the situation. If Musharraf had been successfully countering terrorism, we would not have a situation eight years down the road where (terrorists) actually control territory. Nobody has tried to find the source of the money or the source of the weapons."

"When you put them on trial, you show the wickedness of their crime. Once it becomes abundantly clear that the terrorists' victims are almost entirely  Pakistani civilians, only then will sympathy for their cause be lost. We have to deal with terrorism as a criminal element."

"The civilian government must be supported thoroughly, otherwise we will lose it."

"The administration of justice can be severely hampered if laws emerge from different understandings or perceptions of religion, and their application becomes uneven because of the religious, moral and social beliefs of those administering these laws. Islam and almost all other religions of the world have sectarian and denominational differences. If a national polity is founded on religion, these differences will be manifested in political tensions as well as oppressive restraints on dissent."

Recognition
 2000 – Ginetta Sagan Award of Amnesty International
 2001 – Millennium Peace Prize for Women
 2008 – Editor's Award for Outstanding Achievement by The Lawyer Awards 
2016 – Trinity College Dublin awarded her with an honorary doctorate

See also 

 National Women's Day (Pakistan)

References

External links
Hina Jilani profile
Human Rights Commission of Pakistan (HRCP)
UN Special Representative of the Secretary General on Human Rights Defenders
Biography
Biography
Pakistan's January polls already rigged: UN rights envoy
American Bar Association: Interview with Hina Jilani by Michelle Stephenson October 1999
ABC: Foreign Board: Interview By Jennifer Byrne 2 May 2000
International Federation for Human Rights (FIDH): Interview with Hina Jilani, 14 November 2007
Interview in Human Rights in Australia Magazine By André Dao June 2008
Interview with Hina Jilani (transcript), Law Report, 8 April 2008
Interview with Hina Jilani: Leading rights by Tom Phillips
Asia Society: Interview with Hina Jilani by Nermeen Shaikh, 17 August 2008 
WLUML: Pakistan: Interview with International Jurist Hina Jilani By Beena Sarwar  16 February 2009
War crimes in Gaza: Interview with Hina Jilani by Mark Colvin (audio) 16 September 2009
Hina Jilani Law vs. Power: Who Rules? Who Makes the Rules? (video) 27 November 2009
Interview: The problem lies in the scope of the judgement By Farah Zia and Waqar Gillani 27 December 2009

Articles
Neither Peace Nor Justice By Hina Jilani for Newsline 2 March 2009
Shame on Who? By Hina Jilani for Newsline 7 October 2005

1953 births
Convent of Jesus and Mary, Lahore alumni
Lawyers from Lahore
Living people
Pakistani democracy activists
Pakistani human rights activists
Pakistani lawyers
Pakistani women lawyers
Pakistani women's rights activists
United Nations special rapporteurs
Pakistani women diplomats
Pakistani diplomats
Pakistani officials of the United Nations
Special Representatives of the Secretary-General of the United Nations